Óscar Rendoll Gómez (born 26 August 1916) was a Chilean football manager. He has been one of the five Chileans who have managed the Panama national team along with Óscar Suman (1949), Néstor Valdés (1969), Hugo Tassara (1972–1973) and Renato Panay (1976–1977).

Career
Born in Punta Arenas, Chile, Rendoll Gómez played football at amateur level in local clubs such as Deportivo Español. Then he made a coach course for three years and graduated as a football manager and next worked in the Unión Española youth system until 1946 when he moved to Panama supported by Panamanian Football Federation. The manager of the Panama national team in the late 1940s and early 1950s, he's best known for winning the nation's first international title; the CCCF Championship in 1951. Previously Rendoll Gómez had led the national football team at the 1946 Central American and Caribbean Games, ending the competition with a runner-up medal.

Rendoll Gomez led Panama in the 1952 Panamerican Championship, where the team faced Chile, the team of his country of birth, by first time. The result was a 6–1 loss.

As a curiosity, he used to request help to trading houses and supermarkets to get a suitable food for players.

In 1950, it was founded the first Panamanian referees association with Rendoll Gómez as Honorary President.

Other works
At the same time he studied to become a football manager, he studied and graduated as a PE teacher at the Physical Education Institute of the University of Chile. In Panama, he was well renowned by his contributions in this area, attending to several conferences in countries such as the Dominican Republic, Venezuela, Uruguay, among other countries in Latin America.

Personal life
As a high school student, he was nicknamed Negro (Black) and was elected as Rey Feo (Ugly King/Carnaval King) of the Spring Carnival of Magallanes.

Honours
 CCCF Championship (1): 1951

References

1916 births
Possibly living people
People from Punta Arenas
Chilean footballers
Chilean football managers
Chilean expatriate football managers
Panama national football team managers
Chilean expatriate sportspeople in Panama
Expatriate football managers in Panama